Wrestle Grand Slam in Tokyo Dome was a professional wrestling pay-per-view (PPV) event produced by New Japan Pro-Wrestling (NJPW). The event took place on July 25, 2021, at the Tokyo Dome in Tokyo, Japan. The event was originally scheduled to take place on May 29 but was postponed to July 25 due to the state of emergency in Japan because of the COVID-19 pandemic.

The main event saw Shingo Takagi successfully defend the IWGP World Heavyweight Championship against Hiroshi Tanahashi. Other prominent matches were Los Ingobernables de Japóns Tetsuya Naito and Sanada defending the IWGP Tag Team Championship against Taichi and Zack Sabre Jr. of Dangerous Tekkers, and Kazuchika Okada faced Jeff Cobb.

Production

Background
Since June 2020, NJPW has been unable to run events with a full arena capacity due to COVID-19 restrictions. Wrestle Grand Slam was announced on March 4, 2021 as a two-day event which was originally planned take place on May 15 at Yokohama Stadium in Yokohama and May 29 in the Tokyo Dome. On May 7, NJPW postponed the event due to the state of emergency in Japan. On June 16, NJPW revealed the rescheduled date to be July 25, as well announcing that the Yokohama event would be cancelled with a two event being held at the MetLife Dome in Tokorozawa, Saitama which is scheduled to be held on September 3 and 4. NJPW stopped selling tickets for Wrestle Grand Slam in Tokyo Dome on July 11, due to the second state of state of emergency in Tokyo, although the event will still go ahead as planned.

Storylines

Wrestle Grand Slam in Tokyo Dome featured professional wrestling matches that involved different wrestlers from pre-existing scripted feuds and storylines. Wrestlers portrayed villains, heroes, or less distinguishable characters in the scripted events that built tension and culminated in a wrestling match or series of matches.

At Dominion 6.6 in Osaka-jo Hall on June 7, Shingo Takagi defeated Kazuchika Okada to win the vacant IWGP World Heavyweight Championship, and afterwards challenged Kota Ibushi to a match for the championship. On June 17, the match between the two was scheduled for Wrestle Grand Slam in Tokyo Dome. However, Ibushi was sidelined after being diagnosed with aspiration pneumonia. On the day of the event, Hiroshi Tanahashi was named as Ibushi's replacement.

The first match of the main card saw El Phantasmo & Taiji Ishimori controversially defend their IWGP Junior Heavyweight Tag Team Championship with success against Ryusuke Taguchi & Rocky Romero. In the last minute of the confrontation, Taguchi took off one of El Phantasmo's boots where it seemed like a banned item was resting. However, the referee did not notice Taguchi's remark as El Phantasmo low-blowed the latter and hit him with a CR2 to end the match.

After Shingo Takagi retained the world title over Hiroshi Tanahashi in the main event, Evil returned and layed Takagi down, as he stated that he was the next challenger for the IWGP World Heavyweight Championship.

Results

See also
2021 in professional wrestling

Notes

References

2021 in professional wrestling
2021 in Tokyo
July 2021 events in Japan
Sports events postponed due to the COVID-19 pandemic
New Japan Pro-Wrestling shows
Professional wrestling in Tokyo